1999 Bangabandhu Cup was the 2nd season of the Bangabandhu Cup, after the first edition was held in 1996-7. The second edition ran from 27 August 1999 to 7 September 1999. A Japanese Third Division XI went on to win the cup after defeating the Ghana U–23 team 3-2 in the finals.

Bangabandhu Cup was discontinued after the 1999 edition due to the political situation in the country, and relaunched again in 2015.

Format
In group stage twelve teams divided into four groups of three teams, playing a single match round-robin. The teams finishing first in each group qualified for the Semi-finals.

Group stage

Group A

Group B

Group C

Group D

Knockout stage

Semi-finals

Final

Winners

Team statistics 
Table shows each team's achievements.

References

1999
1999 in Bangladeshi football
1999–2000 in Hungarian football
1999 in Malaysian football
1999 in South Korean football
1999 in Brazilian football
1999 in Thai football
1999–2000 in Ghanaian football
1999 in Uzbekistani football
1999 in Nepalese sport
1999 in Japanese football
1999–2000 in Kuwaiti football
1999–2000 in Indonesian football
International association football competitions hosted by Bangladesh